Scytinostroma hemidichophyticum is a mushroom in the family Lachnocladiaceae.

References

Fungi of Europe
Russulales
Fungi described in 1966